She Watched The Sky is the first EP by the American post-hardcore band A Skylit Drive. It was released on January 23, 2007, on Tragic Hero Records. It is their only release with vocalist Jordan Blake. A music video directed by Brianna Campbell was made for the track, "Drown The City". In the video, A Skylit Drive is seen at a club and playing the song in a parking lot.

Track listing

Personnel
She Watched the Sky album personnel as listed on Allmusic.
A Skylit Drive
Jordan Blake - Lead vocals
Joey Wilson - Lead guitar
Nick Miller - Rhythm guitar
Brian White - Bass, backing unclean vocals
Cory La Quay - Drums, backing unclean vocals
Kyle Simmons - Keyboards, programming

References

External links
 "Drown the City" music video

2007 debut EPs
A Skylit Drive albums